The 1943 Marquette Hilltoppers football team was an American football team that represented Marquette University as an independent during the 1943 college football season. In its third season under head coach Thomas E. Stidham, the team compiled a 3–4–1 record and was outscored by a total of 153 to 143. The team played its home games at Marquette Stadium in Milwaukee.

Schedule

References

Marquette
Marquette Golden Avalanche football seasons
Marquette Hilltoppers football